The Interstate Highways in Montana are the segments of the Dwight D. Eisenhower National System of Interstate and Defense Highways owned and maintained by the Montana Department of Transportation (MDT) in the U.S. state of Montana.

The state's Interstate highways, totaling , were built between 1956 and 1988 at a cost of $1.22 billion. 95 percent of the system serves rural areas, the highest proportion of any state under Interstate program. The entire Interstate system in Montana was designated as the Purple Heart Trail in 2003.



Mainline highways

Business routes

See also

References

External links

 
Interstate